Glaciofluvial deposits or Glacio-fluvial sediments consist of boulders, gravel, sand, silt and clay from ice sheets or glaciers.
They are transported, sorted and deposited by streams of water.
The deposits are formed beside, below or downstream from the ice.
They include kames, kame terraces and eskers formed in ice contact and outwash fans and outwash plains below the ice margin.
Typically the outwash sediment is carried by fast and turbulent  fluvio-glacial meltwater streams, but occasionally it is carried by catastrophic outburst floods.
Larger elements such as boulders and gravel are deposited nearer to the ice margin, while finer elements are carried farther, sometimes into lakes or the ocean.
The sediments are sorted by fluvial processes. 
They differ from glacial till, which is moved and deposited by the ice of the glacier, and is unsorted.

Ice-contact deposits

A subglacial megaflood may cut cavities into the base of the ice.
As the flood dies down, sediment is deposited into these cavities to form cavity-fill drumlins in cavities aligned with the flow, ribbed terrain in cavities that cross the flow and hummocky terrain elsewhere.

A kame is a short mound or ridge with steep sides of sands and gravels deposited from melted ice.
Kames may be isolated or formed in groups.
Some are formed at the base of a glacier by meltwater flowing down from the surface of the ice in a moulin, or from a water body within the glacier.
Others are formed at the margin of the ice as small deltas.
Kame terraces are benches of sand and gravel that were deposited by braided rivers flowing between the side of the valley and the glacier's ice margin.
Kame terraces on opposite sides of a valley glacier may be at different elevations.

Sometimes stratified drift is deposited in the tunnels that run through or below the glacier.
When the ice melts the drift is exposed as long, linear ridges of gravel called eskers.
Some eskers formed in the Pleistocene ice sheets are several hundred kilometers long.
Generally they range in length from a few hundred meters to a few kilometers.

Ice contact deposits, including kames, kame plateaus and eskers, mostly consist of sand and gravel but may include beds of diamicton, silt and clay.
Kames and kame plateaus usually have bases of laminated muds, and higher up have layers of increasingly coarse sands topped with gravel.

Outwash streams

Glaciolfluvial deposits are formed by outwash streams which flow through tunnels within or beneath a glacier.
The water mainly comes from melting, and may also come from rainfall or from run-off from ice-free slopes beside the glacier.
The streams have highly variable rates of flow depending on temperature, which in turn depends on the season, time of day and cloud cover.
At times of high flow, the streams are under pressure.
Streams below the glacier may flow upslope, driven by pressure.

The turbulent and fast-moving meltwater streams cause mechanical erosion through hydraulic action, cavitation and abrasion.
They may also dissolve and remove soluble chemicals from the abraded bedrock and debris below the glacier.
The streams pick up debris from below the glacier, and debris washed in from higher land beside the glacier.
Usually they hold as much debris as they can carry when they leave the glacier.

The large daily fluctuations in discharge affect sediment motion.
The sediment is picked up and carried as the discharge rises, then deposited as discharge falls.
Usually much of the sediment rolls or slides near the bed of the stream.
During the highest discharge periods large boulders may be set in motion.
There may also be high concentrations of suspended sediment in early summer, when discharge is highest.
Lakes or reservoirs below, within, on or beside the glacier may release massive outburst floods known as jökulhlaups.

Outwash deposits

After emerging from its ice tunnel a meltwater stream spreads out and slows down, depositing debris.
The channels become choked and the stream has to find new routes, which may result in a braided stream with channels separated by bars of gravel or sand.
The channel of the braided streams are very unstable due to high loads of sediment, fluctuations in discharge and lack of plants to anchor the banks.
The amount of material deposited is generally greatest near the end of the glacier, so the sediment will tend to slope down and thin out from that point.

Outwash fans are deposits of sediment that fan out from the meltwater portal, with progressively finer sediment at greater distances from the portal.
Fans may be deposited on land or in water.
A line of adjacent outwash fans from an ice sheet may form a ridge, or glaciofluvial moraine.
When many outwash streams flow from the ice front into a lowland area they form a broad sandur, or outwash plain.
A sandar may hold deposits that are tens of meters thick.
In mountainous regions the outwash streams are confined by valley sides and deposit thick layers of sediment in linear outwash plains called valley trains.
Terraces are formed when the streams grade down to lower levels and abandon higher and older outwash plains.

The sediment is deposited in bedforms ranging in scale from sand ripples a few centimeters across to gravel bars several hundred meters long.
The sedimentary structures such as bedding, cross-bedding and clast imbrication are similar to those created by other types of stream.
Near the glacier the outwash plain is composed of long bars of coarse gravel with very variable grain size, with a few large channels between the bars.
Further away there are transverse bars and a web of many braided channels.
The sediment now includes gravel and sand, and the grains are rounder due to sorting and abrasion.
Yet further away, as non-glacial streams join the outwash streams the flow forms shallow braided channels or meandering streams and deposits sand.
Glaciofluvial streams dominated by annual ice melting events may merge into a normal fluvial environment where non-glacial inflows are more important.

Deposits from the subsiding waters of an outburst flood may be poorly sorted, with a wide range of grain sizes, and without distinct bedforms.
Other glaciofluvial sediments resemble sediments from non-glacial fluvial processes.
They mainly consist of silt, sand and gravel with moderately rounded grain.
The sediment nearer the glacier typically is coarser than non-glacial sediment, ranging from boulders down to sand, but with little silt and clay since the water usually flows too fast to allow these fine particle to settle until it is a considerable distance from the glacier.
Generally the outwash deposits are finer further from the margin of the ice.
The deposits often have distinct layers due to the seasonal and episodic changes in stream flow.

Outwash streams often flow into proglacial lakes, where they leave glaciolacustrine deposits.
These mainly consist of silt and clay, with laminations on the millimeter scale.
Sometimes they include varves, alternating coarser sediments in the summer periods of high melt discharge and finer sediment in the winter.
When the stream terminates in the ocean it leaves glaciomarine sediments.
Outwash streams may form deltas where they enter lakes or the ocean.

Kettles

Glaciofluvial deposits may surround and cover large blocks of ice.
The debris may insulate the ice for several hundreds of years.
Eventually the blocks of ice melt, leaving depressions called kettles, or kettle lakes if they fill with water.
Kettles are often associated with ice contact deposits.
They may also form within sheet deposits, but are usually smaller than the ice contact kettles.

See also

 Glacial landform

Notes

Sources

Deposition (geology)